Haruna Garba (born 17 January 1994) is a Nigerian footballer who plays as a striker.

Career
After joining Gżira United on loan from Djurgårdens IF in January 2018, Gzira made the deal permanent in May 2018. He then joined Sudanese club Al-Hilal on loan. In June 2019 he moved to Nemzeti Bajnokság I, joining Debrecen.

References

External links
 
 
 

1994 births
Living people
Nigerian footballers
Nigerian expatriate footballers
Association football forwards
Sliema Wanderers F.C. players
Ħamrun Spartans F.C. players
Dubai CSC players
Djurgårdens IF Fotboll players
Gżira United F.C. players
Debreceni VSC players
Al-Hilal Club (Omdurman) players
A Lyga players
Maltese Premier League players
UAE First Division League players
Allsvenskan players
Nemzeti Bajnokság I players
Suzhou Dongwu F.C. players
China League One players
FC Voluntari players
Liga I players
Nigerian expatriate sportspeople in Lithuania
Nigerian expatriate sportspeople in Malta
Nigerian expatriate sportspeople in the United Arab Emirates
Nigerian expatriate sportspeople in Sweden
Nigerian expatriate sportspeople in Sudan
Nigerian expatriate sportspeople in Hungary
Nigerian expatriate sportspeople in China
Nigerian expatriate sportspeople in Romania
Expatriate footballers in Lithuania
Expatriate footballers in Malta
Expatriate footballers in the United Arab Emirates
Expatriate footballers in Sweden
Expatriate footballers in Sudan
Expatriate footballers in Hungary
Expatriate footballers in China
Expatriate footballers in Romania